The Laudes Regiæ (English: Royal Praises or Royal Acclamations) is a hymn used in the rites of the Catholic Church. There are variant texts, but they most often begin with these words that give the hymn its alternative title: Christus vincit! Christus regnat! Christus imperat! (English: Christ conquers, Christ reigns, Christ commands). 

The melody of the refrain is used as an interval signal for Vatican Radio's shortwave transmissions.

History
This hymn is sung in the Catholic Church at solemn events, such as the inauguration of a pope or, in centuries past, at the coronation of the Holy Roman Emperor. It consists of six sections and a refrain. It is one of the longest hymns. Laudes Regiæ has its origins in as far back as ancient Rome. When Roman leaders such as generals, emperors or consuls entered the Eternal City of Rome after triumph in a great battle, they were met by the chants of the people. Charlemagne himself adopted Roman traditions for his own use. When he was crowned as Emperor of the Romans in 800 A.D., he adopted Christus vincit, Christus regnat, Christus imperat, also called the Laudes Imperiales.

Lyrics 
Most versions begin with the formula "Christus vincit! Christus regnat! Christus imperat!", followed by the invocation "Exaudi Christe" (Hear, Christ) and then an acclamation proper to the occasion, asking for long life for the emperor or pope. These phrases date from pre-Christian times and the addition of exclamations naming saints date to the eighth century.

References

Citations

Sources 

 

Christian hymns
Catholic liturgy
Latin-language Christian hymns